Lukmon Anifaloyin (born 22 December 1986, in Nigeria) is a Nigerian footballer who is last known to have played for Lalor United in Australia.

Australia

One of South Melbourne's new imports for the 2010 Singapore Cup, Anifaloyin was handed his first start in a 1–3 first-leg quarterfinal loss to Bangkok Glass.

With Whittlesea Ranges, the defender was crowned the Best and Fairest for his impartiality in the FFV State League 2 North-West, with 18 votes. He then arrived at Preston Lions in 2014, before committing to stay at Lalor United for 2018.

References 
preston lion 2014 and 2015 best and fairest

External links 
 at ZeroZero
 Sports TG Profile

Nigerian footballers
Expatriate footballers in Singapore
Expatriate soccer players in Australia
1986 births
South Melbourne FC players
Living people
Nigerian expatriate footballers
Singapore Premier League players
Preston Lions FC players
Association football defenders